The Shatt language is an Eastern Sudanic language of the Daju family spoken in the Shatt Hills (part of the Nuba Mountains) southwest of Kaduqli in South Kurdufan province in southern Sudan.

Villages are Shatt Daman, Shatt Safia, and Shatt Tebeldia (Ethnologue, 22nd edition).

Names
The designation "Shatt" is an Arabic word meaning "dispersed" and is applied to several distinct groups in the Nuba Mountains. "Caning" is their own name for themselves. Speakers refer to their language as ìkkɨ̀ cánnìñ ('mouth, language').

References

External links
Ethnologue Language map for Nuba Hills region of Sudan
Language Map of Sudan Huffman, Steve
Caning (Shatt) basic lexicon at the Global Lexicostatistical Database

Daju languages
Severely endangered languages